From the Bottom of My Heart may refer to:

 "From the Bottom of My Heart" (Chuck Willis song), recorded by both The Clovers and The Diamonds
 "From the Bottom of My Heart" (Stevie Wonder song), 2006